The 2015 Sydney Motorsport Park Super Sprint was a motor race for V8 Supercars held on the weekend of 21–23 August 2015. It was the eighth round of fourteen in the 2015 International V8 Supercars Championship.

Championship Standings

Drivers' Championship standings

Teams' Championship standings

 Note: Only the top five positions are included for both sets of standings.

References 

Sydney
August 2015 sports events in Australia